Mar Y Cel or, more correctly, Mar i Cel (Catalan: "Sea and Sky") is an open space preserve conserved by the Land Trust for Santa Barbara County, in Santa Barbara County, California, USA.  Located in the Santa Ynez Mountains foothills above Montecito, Mar Y Cel is a  estate. It includes the notable "Tea Gardens", as well as the West Fork of Cold Springs Trail, a well used hiking trail.

Early history
Henry E. Bothin (pronounced, "bo-THEEN") (d. 1923), of Ohio, came to San Francisco where he built an empire, starting with a spice and coffee factory in 1875, and then gaining large commercial real estate holdings. He was president of Judson Manufacturing Company. Around 1916, Bothin and his second wife, the heiress Ellen "Nellie" Chabot Bothin (1865-1965), added the  Mar Y Cel property, commonly referred to as the "Tea Gardens", to their Montecito estate home, Piranhurst, which was nearing completion. Ellen's deceased father, Antoine "Anthony" Chabot, had been notable for his Bay Area water systems, and had been a colleague of Bothin's. Upon Mar Y Cel, the Bothins built stone aqueducts, water works, arches, and statues.  The water projects included scalloped bowls that rested on columns, allowing water to spill from one into the other. After completion, 35 gardeners maintained the area. Other construction included a 200-seat amphitheater, as well as the "Tea House", built as an open-air piazza, surrounded by four walls. In 1918, Ellen was honored with a gladiolus named in her behalf, the Mrs. H. E. Bothin.

Following the June 29, 1925, magnitude 6.3, Santa Barbara earthquake, three of the Tea House walls were damaged. Subsequently, atmospheric painter and landscape designer Lockwood de Forest, Jr. (1850-1932), added red brick garden planters to the property, while the water garden system was remodeled, costing one million dollars.

After Ellen's death, Edward F. Brown purchased a portion of Piranhurst from the family heirs, that led to the "Tea Gardens" property becoming a separate parcel which the Bothin family sold to Mr. Shirley Carter Burden (1908-1989), fine arts photographer, writer, and great-great-grandson of Cornelius Vanderbilt. Burden later resold it to the current owners.

Later history
In September 2000, Cima del Mundo LLC, an environmental investment group, offered to donate a conservation easement on a portion of Mar Y Cel:  the northern .  This eliminated the possibility of future residential development while ensuring the protection of both wildlife habitat and the property's scenic beauty. In addition, the company granted a  easement to the Land Trust ensuring that a portion of the Cold Spring Trail is open for public use.

On November 13, 2008, the Montecito Tea Fire ignited the historic "Tea House" structure, above Mountain Drive. Over the course of several days, the fire spread and burned , destroyed over 200 homes, and injured 13 people.

References

External links
 Archives.si.edu: Photos of "Mrs. H.E. Bothin's gardens at Piranhurst" — in 1930  ("including red brick planters").

Gardens in California
History of Santa Barbara County, California
Landscape design history of the United States
Parks in Santa Barbara County, California
Montecito, California
Santa Ynez Mountains